Iryanthera campinae is a species of plant in the family Myristicaceae. It is endemic to Brazil.

References

Flora of Brazil
Myristicaceae
Endangered plants
Taxonomy articles created by Polbot